Viola gracilis, also known as the Olympian violet, is a species of flowering plant within the family Violaceae.

Description 
Viola gracilis is a perennial species, which grows to form dense mats. Leaves are ovate to oblong and range from 2–3 cm long. Plants possess decumbent based stems, which can range from 5–30 cm long. Plants flower between May and August. Flowers can be yellow or violet in colour, but never bicoloured. The spur of the flower is 6-7mm and can be straight or slightly curved. Stipules have oblanceolate, spathulate lobes.

Distribution 
Viola gracilis is native to Europe where it can be found in the countries of Albania, Bulgaria, Yugoslavia and Turkey. Turkish populations are only present in western Turkey.

Habitat 
Viola gracilis grows in grassy mountain woodlands and alpine meadows. It can also be found growing amongst rocks. It has been recorded growing at altitudes ranging from 1250 to 2000 meters above sea level.

References 

gracilis